George Muñoz is an American politician and a Democratic member of the New Mexico Senate representing District 4 since January 2009.

Education
Munoz graduated from Gallup High School and attended the University of Arizona but did not graduate.

Elections
2012 Muñoz was challenged in the three-way June 5, 2012 Democratic Primary, winning with 2,614 votes (56.3%) and was unopposed for the November 6, 2012 General election, winning with 11,673 votes.
2008 When District 4 incumbent Democratic Senator Lidio Rainaldi retired and left the seat open, Muñoz ran in the four-way June 8, 2008 Democratic Primary, winning with 1,933 votes (43.2%) and won the November 4, 2008 General election with 10,897 votes (75.6%) against Republican nominee Beatrice Woodward.

References

External links
Official page at the New Mexico Legislature

George Munoz at Ballotpedia
George K. Munoz at OpenSecrets

Hispanic and Latino American state legislators in New Mexico
Place of birth missing (living people)
Year of birth missing (living people)
Living people
Democratic Party New Mexico state senators
People from Gallup, New Mexico
University of Arizona alumni
21st-century American politicians